The United States Air Force's Follow-on Test and Evaluation (FOT&E) program for intercontinental ballistic missiles (ICBMs) is designated Glory Trip (GT).

List of GLORY TRIP Launches

United States defense procurement
Intercontinental ballistic missiles